The 2011 ARFU Development Cup was the second edition of the tournament. It was an official tournament for developing teams. There was no Division I tournament. The games were played in Vientiane, Laos, from the 24th to the 26th of November. Each game lasted for 60 minutes.

Standings

Results

References 

2011 in Asian rugby union
2011 in women's rugby union
Asia Rugby Women's Championship
Rugby union in China
Rugby union in Laos
Rugby union in the Philippines
Rugby union in Thailand
Asia Rugby